Rodion Shishkov (born July 9, 1980, in Leningrad, USSR) is a Russian tech entrepreneur, the founder of Samokat and Buyk dark store rapid delivery services. His company TRA Robotics designs and builds highly automated microfactories, including the production facilities for the British unmanned commercial electric vehicle manufacturer Arrival. He's also a former Yota and Russian Post executive responsible for developing and delivering new digital services.

Background 

Rodion Shishkov was born in Leningrad on July 9, 1980. He holds a degree in Marketing from Saint Petersburg State University of Economics and Finance (2002). He started his career at 19 and worked in several fields, such as retail, real estate development, telecommunications, and IT.

Yota 

Rodion Shishkov held executive positions in Yota from 2008 to 2013. He was the head of the company's R&D center Yota Lab. He managed the creation of the music streaming service Yota Music and movie streaming platform Yota Play which was later rebranded to Okko and became Russia's second largest video streaming service by 2019. Shishkov resigned from Yota as the company's vice president of innovations.

Russian Post 

From 2013 to 2017, Rodion Shishkov was the deputy CEO of the Russian Post, responsible for digital services, new products, and integrations with public services. He set the basis for the company's information technology and digitalization team (Pochta Tech) and started the digital transformation of the Russian Post. Under his management, the company laumched its own payment gateway, API for delivery services automation, online subscription to newspapers and magazines, a digital official mail service with acknowledgment of receipt, and a web portal focused on all the new digital services provided by the Russian Post.

Entrepreneurship

TRA Robotics 

Rodion Shishkov is the founder of TRA Robotics. The company designs and builds automated microfactories allowing for flexible, software-driven manufacturing with capital expenditures a dozen times less than traditional factories. TRA Robotics became a part of autonomous electric vans designer and manufacturer Arrival and built its facility in Banbury, Oxfordshire, considered one of the UK's most technologically advanced factories

Samokat 

In 2017, Rodion Shishkov and Slava Bocharov founded Smart.Space, a company and app focused on improving service convenience in business centers and residential complexes. Among other services, it provided a rapid delivery of grocery and consumer goods under the name Magazinchik. In January 2018, it was split into a separate company Samokat, which became the first dark store delivery service (according to Inc. magazine) and was the fastest-growing food technology company in Russia.

Samokat's complex technological background included demand forecasting and delivery control systems. It became the world's second app (after Getir) to offer a 15-minute delivery. By 2021, Samokat made up to 900,000 deliveries monthly. In April 2020, a controlling share in Samokat was acquired by Sberbank and the Mail.ru Group.

Buyk 

Following the success of Samokat in Russia, Shishkov and Bocharov launched a US-based dark store delivery company Buyk, which used some elements of Samokat's technological backend. Buyk began operations in New York City in September 2021 and in Chicago in December. By the end of 2022, the company planned to expand to Boston, Houston, and Miami. The growth was supported by investments from Fort Ross Ventures and Lev Leviev's LVL1 venture fund.

By the time Russia launched the full-scale invasion into Ukraine, Buyk was between the funding rounds and fully dependent on bridge financing from its founders. The sanctions against Sberbank (also the investor of Fort Ross Ventures) hampered their ability to continue funding Buyk. On March 17, 2022, the company filed for bankruptcy.

References 

Living people
1980 births
Russian businesspeople in information technology
Russian business executives